Thomas Caulfield may refer to:

 Thomas Caulfeild (1685–1717), also spelt Caulfield, British Lieutenant-Governor of Nova Scotia
 Thomas Caulfield  (1766–1815), a British actor
 Thomas J. Caulfield (1939–2007), American architect